Akram Hassan Afif Yahya Afif Al Yafei (born 18 November 1996) is a Qatari professional footballer who plays as a left winger for Qatar Stars League club Al Sadd and the Qatar national team.

Early in his career, he was considered to be one of the most promising players to emerge from Qatar. Akram has been named in a three-man shortlist for the Asian Football Confederation’s men's player of the year for bringing the 2019 Asian Cup to Qatar. He won the Asian Footballer of the Year award in 2019.

Familial history 
Afif was born in Doha to Somali-Yemeni father Hassan Afif from the Yafa tribe, and Afif’s mother is from Yemen. The family is associated with a large Yemeni-Somali clan known as the Benadiri people. Afif's father was born in Tanzania and later moved to Somalia. His father was a top player for Horseed in Somalia and the Somalia national team, before moving to Qatar and playing for Al Ittihad. He later became a Qatari citizen. After he retired from playing, he managed Al-Gharafa from 1986 till 1987 and Al-Markhiya from 2001 till 2003 and 2006 till 2007.

Club career
Akram started off in the youth teams of Al-Markhiya and then Al Sadd before joining the Al Sadd as a full-time student in 2009. During his time at Aspire, Afif traveled to Spain on an exchange student program and played for the youth teams of Sevilla and Villarreal.

He represented Sevilla in the 2013 Al Kass International Cup, netting a brace and earning an assist in the team's first match, which ended as a 3–0 victory against Aspire Academy.

Afif later joined Villarreal's youth team.

Eupen
In January 2015, Afif was signed by Belgian club Eupen. He scored a goal in his debut against Eendracht Aalst on 19 January. On 24 January in his next match against KRC Mechelen, he assisted in three of his side's five goals.

Afif finished his first senior season with two goals in nine matches. On 18 March 2016, he scored a brace in a 4–0 home win against KSV Roeselare.

Villarreal
On 8 May 2016, it was confirmed that Afif would be rejoining Villarreal, this time on a permanent deal. In doing so, he became the first Qatari-born signing in La Liga history. On 4 August, he was loaned to fellow top tier club Sporting de Gijón in a season-long deal.

Afif made his debut in the main category of Spanish football on 21 August 2016, coming on as a substitute for Burgui in a 2–1 home win against Athletic Bilbao. After nine league matches, he returned to his first senior club Eupen on a one-year loan deal on 14 July 2017.
He went back to his home country in January 2018 to play for Al Sadd where he had a very successful season.

International career

Afif featured in Qatar U20's AFC U-19 Championship qualification campaign in 2014. During the main tournament, he scored the lone goal in the final against DPR Korea to give Qatar the victory.

He was called up to the senior national team in September 2015 by coach Daniel Carreño. He scored in Qatar's 15–0 win against Bhutan on 3 September 2015 during the 2018 World Cup Qualification rounds. He also registered an assist in the match.

During Qatar's successful 2019 AFC Asian Cup campaign, Afif played a paramount role in helping his team lift the trophy, registering 10 assists overall, a new record in the tournament.

Personal life
Afif is of Yemeni Arab heritage. He was born in Doha, Qatar. His mother, Fayza, is of Yemeni descent from the Yafa tribe and is a homemaker. His father, Hassan Afif, is of Yemeni descent however, he played for the national team and spent a portion of his life in Somali and was born in Moshi in Tanzania. His father previously played for Simba in Tanzania but later moved to Somalia where he went on to play for Horseed FC. He subsequently moved to Qatar and played for Al Ittihad (later renamed Al Gharafa). After retiring, he managed Al Gharafa from 1986 until 1987 and Al Markhiya from 2001 until 2003 and 2006 until 2007.

His brother, Ali Afif, is a footballer for QSL side Al-Duhail SC. 

Afif learned Spanish for his move to Sevilla.

In June 2015, he graduated from Aspire Academy.

Career statistics

Club

International
Scores and results list Qatar's goal tally first.

Honours

Al Sadd
Qatar Stars League: 2018–19, 2020–21, 2021–22
Emir Cup: 2020, 2021
Qatar Cup: 2020, 2021
Sheikh Jassim Cup: 2019
Qatari Stars Cup: 2019-20

Qatar
AFC Asian Cup: 2019
International Friendship Championship: 2018

Individual
Qatar Stars League Top goalscorer: 2019–20
Qatar Stars League Top assists provider: 2018–19, 2019–20
Qatar Stars League Team of the Year: 2018–19, 2019–20
Qatar Stars League Player of the Year : 2018–19, 2019–20
Estad Doha Qatar Player of the Year: 2018, 2019
AFC Asian Cup Team of the Tournament: 2019
Asian Footballer of the Year: 2019
IFFHS AFC Man Team of the Year: 2020
 CONCACAF Gold Cup Best XI: 2021
FIFA Arab Cup Bronze Ball: 2021

References

External links

1996 births
Living people
Qatari people of Yemeni descent
Qatari people of Tanzanian descent
Qatari people of Somali descent
Naturalised citizens of Qatar
People from Doha
Qatari footballers
Association football forwards
Aspire Academy (Qatar) players
K.A.S. Eupen players
Sporting de Gijón players
Villarreal CF players
Al Sadd SC players
Challenger Pro League players
Belgian Pro League players
La Liga players
Qatar Stars League players
Qatar youth international footballers
Qatar under-20 international footballers
Qatar international footballers
2019 AFC Asian Cup players
2019 Copa América players
2021 CONCACAF Gold Cup players
AFC Asian Cup-winning players
Qatari expatriate footballers
Qatari expatriate sportspeople in Belgium
Qatari expatriate sportspeople in Spain
Expatriate footballers in Belgium
Expatriate footballers in Spain
2022 FIFA World Cup players